PZL M-4 Tarpan (also tarpan) was a Polish trainer and sports aircraft prototype of the 1960s, designed in WSK-Mielec.

Design and development 

The M-4 was designed for a demand of the Polish Aero Club, for a trainer plane with a retractable tricycle landing gear.  It was based on an earlier project PZL M-2.  The basic variant was to be M-4P, for navigation training.  The works started in 1958, and the first prototype was built in 1960.  Due to a long engine development, it first flew on September 7, 1961 (registration SP-PAW).  Trials showed, that the weight was much higher, than estimated (890 kg instead of 748 kg), which demanded changes in design.  In July 1964 the second prototype was flown (registration SP-PAK).

The flight characteristics and stability of the M-4 were estimated as good, it was also fit to aerobatics and rally flying.  The cab offered an excellent view for the crew and the plane was overall quite successful.  However, because of too high price, the Polish Aero Club decided not to order the plane and the production has not started.  A development of the flat engine PZL WN-6 was troublesome and was finally canceled at that time as well.

Description 
Metal construction low-wing monoplane, conventional in layout, metal covered.  Semi-monocoque fuselage. Trapezoid two-spar wings. Crew of two, sitting in tandem, under a common canopy, with double controls (student in front, instructor in the rear).  Retractable tricycle landing gear. Two-blade wooden propeller of variable pitch (diameter 2 m). Fuel tanks in wings (140 L).

Operational history 
In 1965 both prototypes were converted to single seater aerobatics variant (in some sources known as the M-4A) by removing front cab equipment.  It was planned to use them in World Aerobatics Championship in 1966 in Moscow, but they have not finished full homologation trials and the idea was abandoned.  They were not used in this role much.

Operators 

Aeroklub Polski operated second prototype in Mielec.

Survivors 
The second M-4 prototype (SP-PAK) is preserved in the Polish Aviation Museum in Kraków, from 1971.

Specifications

See also

References

Janusz Babiejczuk, Jerzy Grzegorzewski: Polski przemysł lotniczy 1945-1973, Warsaw 1973 (Polish language)
Marian Krzyżan: Samoloty w muzeach polskich, WKiŁ, Warsaw 1983,  (Polish language)

1960s Polish civil trainer aircraft
1960s Polish sport aircraft
M04
Low-wing aircraft
Single-engined tractor aircraft
Aircraft first flown in 1961